The Atheists In Kenya Society is an atheist organization, registered under the Societies Act in Kenya. It is the first non-religious society to be registered in the country. The society believes that the most reasonable conclusions are the ones that have the best evidence. It is a member organisation of Humanists International.

The society was established in Nairobi, Kenya, on February 17, 2016. Harrison Mumia is the founder and president. The foundation has its headquarters in Cargen House, Nairobi.

History 
In 2013, a group of Kenyans met with the aim of establishing a nonreligious society. They held informal meetings in various restaurants in Nairobi and used social media, especially Facebook, to connect with like-minded Kenyans. This group included Ssemakula Mukiibi, Zack Wanambwa, Elizabeth Wangari, Ellen Mical and Beatrice Mwikya. In 2015, they applied for registration, which was first rejected by the Deputy Registrar of Societies in Kenya.

On February 17, 2016, the Kenyan government issued Mumia with a certificate for the organization under Societies Act, Cap 108.

In 2016, April, the society's registration was suspended by the then Attorney General, Githu Muigai, due to pressure from the Kenya National Congress of Pentecostal Churches, who claimed the establishment of the group threatened the public peace. Mumia then took the case to the High Court of Kenya, where he challenged the suspension.

In 2018, the High Court of Kenya quashed the suspension and had the society reinstated.

Aims 
The objects of the society are:

To promote and practice the open, rational, and scientific examination of the universe and our place in it.
To advocate that ethics and morality be meaningfully based on rational and humanistic ideals and values.
To promote skeptical inquiry.
To provide community for atheists.
To organize activities, such as forums for discussion, guest speakers and debates.
To foster public acceptance of atheists in Kenya.
To engage in social issues affecting its membership and the wider community.

Activism

In 2015, the group called for the passage of laws that would prohibit street preachers from spreading the faith in public places, including matatus.
In 2016, AIK wrote to the Commissioner-General of the Kenya Revenue Authority, John Njiraini, demanding that churches not be exempt from taxes.
In 2020, the society, through its president, Mumia, paid school fees for one of the top students in 2019 KCPE from Baringo County.
The Association has also pursued several campaigns in court to advocate for the scrapping of religious education in Kenyan's basic education curriculum.
They have also lobbied for February 17 to be declared as an atheist national holiday.

In 2022, the group called on political parties and politicians sign a declaration stating they will respect and not discriminate against anybody on the basis of their religion or lack of one.

The Executive Committee 
The Executive Committee since December 16, 2021:
 Harrison Mumia – President
 Moureen Temba – Vice President
 Mary Kamau – Secretary
 Samson Mbavu – Treasurer
 Kenny Githungo – Assistant Treasurer
 Rebecca Sarange – Assistant Secretary

See also 
 Irreligion in Kenya
 Major religious groups
 List of secularist organizations.
 Religion in Kenya

References

External links 
 

Secularist organizations
Atheist organizations
Organizations established in 2016
2016 establishments in Kenya
Religion in Kenya
Irreligion in Kenya